Doolin is a surname. Notable people with the surname include:

Bill Doolin (1858–1896), American outlaw
 Charles Elmer Doolin, potato chips business founder
James Doolin (1932–2002), American painter
Lena Doolin Mason (1864–1924), American Methodist preacher and poet
Mickey Doolin (1880–1951), American baseball player
Paul Doolin (born 1963), Irish footballer
William Doolin, American politician